Carpineto della Nora is a comune and town in the province of Pescara, Abruzzo region, Italy. It is located in the Gran Sasso e Monti della Laga National Park.

See also
Abbey of San Bartolomeo

References